No. 903 Expeditionary Air Wing is an Expeditionary Air Wing of the Royal Air Force. It is currently based at RAF Akrotiri in Cyprus and is tasked with conducting operations against ISIL in Iraq & Syria

It was activated during 2003 as part of a modernisation package to make the RAF more deployable on an expeditionary basis. It was stationed at Camp Bastion in Afghanistan controlling RAF operations at the air base there between Summer 2009 and November 2014. It used to report to No. 83 Expeditionary Air Group.

History

Second World War
The wing was active from 1 December 1944 to 31 October 1945 as a tactical wing, part of No. 224 Group RAF, Third Tactical Air Force. It was formed at Chittagong Airfield from RAF HQ Patenga. In December 1944 it was temporarily at Comilla with No. 67 Squadron RAF (Supermarine Spitfire); 

In May 1945, the Wing provided close support to ground forces as they recaptured Rangoon before being redeployed to attack concentrations of Japanese forces remaining in Burma. On 12 September No. 903 Wing was stationed at Kallang, the old civil airport of Singapore City when Lord Louis Mountbatten accepted the formal surrender of all Japanese forces in south-east Asia. It included No. 31 Squadron RAF (Douglas Dakota). On 31 October 1945 No 903 Wing was disbanded, becoming Station Headquarters Kallang.

Operation Telic

The wing was re-commissioned into service during 2003 and sent to Contingency Operating Base Basra as part of Operation Telic.

The wing stayed at Basra until May 2009.

Operation Herrick

During mid-2009 the wing was moved to Camp Bastion, Afghanistan as part of Operation Herrick. It consisted of:
 Westland Sea Kings operated by 845, 846, 854 & 857 Naval Air Squadrons.
 An RAF Force Protection Wing
 Thales Watchkeeper WK450's operated by 32nd Regiment Royal Artillery & 47th Regiment Royal Artillery.
It also supported the following:
 Joint Helicopter Force (Afghanistan) that consisted of:
 AgustaWestland Apache's operated by 3 and 4 Regiments Army Air Corps.
 Chinooks operated by No. 1310 Flight RAF.
 Merlin HC2s operated by 28(AC) and 78 Squadrons RAF.
 Elements of Tactical Supply Wing.
 Visiting Air Mobility aircraft including:
 Airbus Voyager KC2 and KC3s operated by No. 10 Squadron RAF and 101 Squadron RAF.
 Lockhead Tristar aircraft operated by 216 Squadron RAF.
 Boeing C-17A Globemaster III's operated by No. 99 Squadron RAF.
 Hercules C-130J's operated by 24, 30, 47 & 70 Squadrons RAF.
Camp Bastion was handed over to the ANSF as the United Kingdom withdraws from Afghanistan and 903 EAW was stood down in November 2014.

Operation Shader 
In December 2015 the Wing reformed at RAF Akrotiri to replace No 140 EAW as part of Operation Shader.  It consists of:
 Elements of the RAF Typhoon Force (9 x Typhoon FGR.4 multirole fighter aircraft (6 active, 3 reserve))
 Elements of the RAF Air Mobility Force:
 2 x Hercules C5 transport aircraft (1 withdrawn during 2014)
 2 x Voyager KC3 tanker aircraft
 Elements of the RAF ISTAR Force

Aircraft have been using RAF Akrotiri as their home base whilst carrying out these operations. In February 2019, the Tornado force (previously involving up to 10 strike aircraft on rotation) returned to RAF Marham for retirement. Their role in theatre is being undertaken by the Typhoon detachment. Sentry AEW1 AEW&C aircraft from No. 8 Squadron were previously employed on operations. However, the aircraft was withdrawn from RAF service in 2021. The previously employed Sentinel R1 ISTAR aircraft from No. V(AC) Squadron was similarly retired in March 2021.

Commanders
 Group Captain Paul Burt (Op TELIC 9/10 May-Nov 2007)
 Group Captain Mike Wigston (Nov 2007 - Apr 2008)
 Group Captain Andrew (during 2008).
 Wing Commander Ian Richardson (during 2009).
 Wing Commander Mark Flewin (2014).
 Group Captain Charles Dickens (2019).
 Group Captain Andrew Coope (Oct 18 - Mar 19)
 Group Captain Jonathon Moreton (Apr 19 - Oct 19).
 Group Captain Ian Townsend (Oct 19 - Feb 20).
 Wing Commander Calvin Bailey (Feb 20 - Jul 20).
 Wing Commander Dutch Holland (Jul 21 - Jan 22).

See also

 International Security Assistance Force (ISAF)
 Operation Herrick aerial order of battle

References

E 903